Lindsay Wilson (born 5 April 1979) is an Australian former international soccer player who played professionally in Australia, the Netherlands, and Scotland, as a defender. Wilson made a total of 196 league career appearances, and scored 9 league goals.

Career

Club career
Born in Sydney, Wilson began his career in his native Australia for Canberra Cosmos and Sydney Olympic between 1996 and 2002. He then moved to the Netherlands to play with PSV Eindhoven, where he spent loan spells at FC Volendam and Helmond Sport, as well as Scottish side Kilmarnock. At Kilmarnock, Wilson made 13 appearances in the Scottish Premier League. After leaving PSV, Wilson trialled with English side Derby County and Scottish side Dundee United.

International career
Wilson earned 8 caps for the Australian under-20 team in 1998 and 1999.

Wilson won two caps for the Australian national team in 2001, both of which came in FIFA World Cup qualifying matches.

References

External links
 
 
 

1979 births
Living people
Australian soccer players
Australia international soccer players
Australian expatriate soccer players
Eredivisie players
Soccer players from Sydney
FC Volendam players
PSV Eindhoven players
Kilmarnock F.C. players
Scottish Premier League players
Sydney Olympic FC players
Expatriate footballers in the Netherlands
Expatriate footballers in Scotland
Association football defenders